The 1st Legislative Assembly of Singapore was a meeting of the Legislative Assembly of Singapore from 22 April 1955 until 31 March 1959.

Officeholders 
 Speaker: Sir George Oehlers
 Deputy Speaker: Richard Lim Chuan Hoe (LF, later MCA)
 Chief Minister:
 David Marshall (LF) until 7 June 1956
 Lim Yew Hock (LF, later SPA) from 7 June 1956
 Leader of the Opposition: Lee Kuan Yew (PAP)

Composition

Members

Elected members

Ex-officio members

Nominated members

Changes in members

By-elections

Appointments

Vacant seats

Changes in party affiliation

Post-dissolution changes in party affiliation

References 

Singapore government policies
Legislative branch of the Singapore Government
Parliament of Singapore